Kraven the Hunter is an upcoming American superhero film based on the Marvel Comics character of the same name, produced by Columbia Pictures in association with Marvel. Distributed by Sony Pictures Releasing, it is intended to be the fourth film in Sony's Spider-Man Universe (SSU). The film is being directed by J. C. Chandor from a screenplay by Art Marcum & Matt Holloway and Richard Wenk, and stars Aaron Taylor-Johnson in the title role alongside Ariana DeBose and Fred Hechinger.

Kraven the Hunter was considered for film appearances several times before Sony became interested in a standalone film for the character, as part of their new shared universe, in 2017. Wenk was hired in August 2018, with Marcum and Holloway joining later. Chandor entered negotiations to direct in August 2020, and was confirmed in May 2021 when Taylor-Johnson was cast. Further casting took place in early 2022, before filming began in late March in London, England and concluded by mid-June. Shooting also occurred in Iceland, and was expected to occur in Glasgow.

Kraven the Hunter is scheduled to be released in the United States on October 6, 2023.

Cast 

 Aaron Taylor-Johnson as Sergei Kravinoff / Kraven: A big-game hunter. Taylor-Johnson described his take on the character as a conservationist, a "protector of the natural world", and an "animal lover".
 Ariana DeBose as Calypso: A voodoo priestess and Kraven's love interest.

 Fred Hechinger as Dmitri Smerdyakov / Chameleon: Kraven's half-brother who is a master of disguise.

Christopher Abbott and Alessandro Nivola have been cast as the villains of the film, while Russell Crowe and Levi Miller have been cast in undisclosed roles.

Production

Development 
Director Sam Raimi planned to include the Marvel Comics character Kraven the Hunter in his fourth Spider-Man film before that project was cancelled in favor of rebooting the franchise with The Amazing Spider-Man (2012). Sony Pictures announced plans in December 2013 for The Amazing Spider-Man 2 (2014) to establish a shared universe—inspired by the Marvel Cinematic Universe (MCU)—based on the Marvel properties they held the rights to. Kraven was teased in that film, with its director Marc Webb expressing interest in seeing the character appear on film. In February 2015, Sony and Marvel Studios announced a new partnership to co-produce the film Spider-Man: Homecoming (2017), and integrate the Spider-Man character with Marvel's MCU. Sony announced their own shared universe, "Sony's Spider-Man Universe", in May 2017. Sony intended this to be "adjunct" to their MCU Spider-Man films, featuring Spider-Man related properties beginning with Venom (2018). The studio was considering a Kraven film for the universe. Before director Ryan Coogler learned that Sony had the film rights for Kraven, he hoped to include the character in his MCU film Black Panther (2018) because of a fight between Black Panther and Kraven in Christopher Priest's Black Panther comic book run.

Richard Wenk was hired to write a screenplay for Kraven the Hunter in August 2018, a month after the successful release of Sony's The Equalizer 2, which he wrote. The project was billed as "the next chapter" of Sony's shared universe. Wenk was tasked with introducing Kraven to audiences and figuring out which character he could hunt in the film since Spider-Man, considered to be Kraven's "white whale" in the comic books, was unlikely to appear due to the MCU deal. Whether the film would target adult audiences would depend on the audience response to Venom darker approach. In October, Wenk said he was "cracking" the story and tone of the film before beginning scripting. He intended to adhere to the character's comic book lore, including by featuring Kraven fighting Spider-Man. Wenk said Sony intended to adapt the Kraven's Last Hunt comic book storyline, and there were ongoing discussions over whether to do that in this film or a later one. Wenk compared the latter approach to the two-part film Kill Bill. He expressed interest in having Equalizer director Antoine Fuqua join the film; Fuqua considered directing Sony's Marvel-based film Morbius (2022), and would decide on directing Kraven based on the script. Sony confirmed that a film featuring Kraven was in development in March 2019.

Jon Watts, director of Homecoming and its sequel Spider-Man: Far From Home (2019), expressed interest in featuring Kraven in a potential third Spider-Man film set within the MCU; Watts pitched a film pitting Peter Parker / Spider-Man against Kraven to Spider-Man star Tom Holland, but this idea was abandoned in favor of the story of Spider-Man: No Way Home (2021). By August 2020, Art Marcum and Matt Holloway had re-written the script, after doing uncredited rewrites for Morbius. At that time, J. C. Chandor entered talks to direct the film, while Matt Tolmach and Avi Arad were set as producers. Amy Pascal also serves as a producer. Chandor was confirmed as director in May 2021, when Aaron Taylor-Johnson was cast to star as Kraven. Sony had previously approached actors such as Brad Pitt, Keanu Reeves, John David Washington, and Adam Driver for the role, but Sony executives moved quickly to cast Taylor-Johnson after they were "blow[n] away" by early footage of him in the film Bullet Train (2022). Taylor-Johnson began negotiations shortly after an initial phone call with Chandor and Tolmach. By July, Jodie Turner-Smith was reportedly in talks to portray Kraven's love interest, Calypso. That October, Holland said he and Pascal had discussed him potentially reprising his role as Spider-Man in the film.

Pre-production 
Russell Crowe was cast in an undisclosed role in early February 2022. The Hollywood Reporter noted that many of the main characters in the film would be members of Kraven's family, with Crowe potentially portraying Kraven's father. By then, Kodi Smit-McPhee had been offered the role of Chameleon, Kraven's half-brother, but declined due to a scheduling conflict. Turner-Smith was also confirmed to have not been cast as Calypso. Later in February, Fred Hechinger joined the cast, reportedly as Chameleon. In March, Ariana DeBose joined the cast, reportedly in the Calypso role, Alessandro Nivola was cast as a villain, and Christopher Abbott was cast as the film's main villain, which was reported to be the Foreigner. Nivola said he joined the film to work with Chandor again after A Most Violent Year (2014). Taylor-Johnson was preparing for stunt training with Chandor in England, just outside of London, for the following couple of weeks.

Filming 
Filming occurred in Iceland in early February 2022, at Lake Mývatn, using the working title Safari. TrueNorth Productions handled the production services, with an 80-person crew involved in the shooting over two days. Principal photography began on March 20, 2022, in London, England, under the working title Spiral. Ben Davis served as cinematographer after doing so for several MCU films. Levi Miller joined the cast in April, and DeBose confirmed that she was portraying Calypso in the film a month later when she had already been filming in London. In mid-June, Taylor-Johnson revealed that he had wrapped filming and stated that the film was shot entirely on location, which he said "add[ed] something really beautiful" to the personal story, and called it important for the authenticity of the character. Nivola also wrapped filming at that time, and said the characters' physical abilities in the film were grounded in reality, while Chandor described it as depicting the "most incredible Olympic athlete you've ever seen". Filming was also expected to occur in Glasgow, Scotland.

Post-production 
In August 2022, Nivola revealed that the film would include a time jump and that his character would physically transform in the third act, which he did not use any visual effects for. He described it as a "classic villain role" with "complex psychology and personal history to draw on". The following month, Hechinger confirmed that he was portraying Dmitri Smerdyakov / Chameleon. Later in September, the film's release date was delayed to October 6, 2023.

Marketing 
Sony debuted the first footage from the film in a "show reel" of the studio's upcoming films at CinemaCon in April 2022.

Release 
Kraven the Hunter is scheduled to be theatrically released in the United States on October 6, 2023, in IMAX. It was previously scheduled for January 13, 2023.

In December 2022, Sony signed a long-term deal with the Canadian-based streaming service Crave for their films starting in April 2023, following the films' theatrical and home media windows. Crave signed for the "pay-one" window streaming rights, which included Kraven the Hunter.

Future 
Taylor-Johnson signed on to portray Kraven in multiple films.

References

External links 
 

2020s American films
2020s English-language films
2020s superhero films
2023 action films
American action films
American superhero films
Columbia Pictures films
Films about hunters
Films based on works by Stan Lee
Films based on works by Steve Ditko
Films directed by J. C. Chandor
Films produced by Amy Pascal
Films produced by Avi Arad
Films produced by Matt Tolmach

Films shot in Iceland
Films shot in London
Films with screenplays by Art Marcum and Matt Holloway
Films with screenplays by Richard Wenk
IMAX films
Sony's Spider-Man Universe